Ghattas Khoury is a professor of General and Vascular Surgery at the American University of Beirut Medical Center and a Lebanese politician. He is the former Minister of Culture in Lebanon (2016 - 2019). He is also a former member of the Lebanese parliament (2000 - 2005) and former president of the Lebanese Order of Physicians (1998 - 2001).

Titles
 Professor, General and Vascular surgery, American University of Beirut Medical Center
 Fellow, Royal College of Surgeons, England
 Fellow, American College of Surgeons
 Member of several international scientific societies in general, vascular, and laparoscopic surgery

Education
Khoury graduated from Marjeyoun National College and went on to study medicine at eh Complutense University of Madrid, graduating with a diploma in medicine in 1978. In 1983, he gained a diploma in General Surgery from the American University of Beirut. He gained his degree in Vascular Surgery from St. Mary's Hospital, London, Imperial College, in 1984, and in 1986 a diploma in General Surgery from the South East Thames Regional Health Authority. He also holds a Master's degree in Diplomacy and Strategic Negotiations from  La Sagesse University and the University of Paris-XI which he completed in 2013. He is fluent in Arabic, English, and Spanish.

Public Service
In 1998, Khoury was elected President of the Lebanese Order of Physicians, where he served till 2001. During the 2000 parliamentary elections in Lebanon, he was elected Maronite deputy for Beirut on the list of former Prime Minister Rafic Hariri. As a member of parliament, he joined the Parliamentary Committee for Public Health and Social Affairs. In 2005, Khoury withdrew his candidacy from the parliamentary elections in favor of Solange Bachir Gemayel in Beirut. During Prime Minister Saad Hariri's second government in 2016, he was appointed Minister of Culture and served in this capacity till 2019. He is currently one of the closest advisers to former Prime Minister Saad Hariri.

Merits and Awards
In 1983, he was chosen British Council Scholar and in 1996, American College of Surgeons Scholar. He was also awarded the Lebanese Order of Merit in 2001 and the Order of the General Maronite Council in 2018. Recently, in February of 2020, Khoury was awarded the Royal Spanish Order of Civil Merit, the Rank of Numbered Commander in recognition of extraordinary services for the mutual beneficial cooperation between Spain and Lebanon.

References 

Year of birth missing (living people)
Living people

Members of the Parliament of Lebanon
Lebanese physicians
Complutense University of Madrid alumni
Government ministers of Lebanon
American University of Beirut alumni
Academic staff of the American University of Beirut
Fellows of the American College of Surgeons
Fellows of the Royal College of Surgeons